Tamsalu is a town in Tapa Parish, Lääne-Viru County, Estonia.

History
The town was first mentioned in 1512, but remained an insignificant village until 1876. After that it was on the railroad line from Tartu to Tallinn. It was given town status in 1996. Before the administrative reform in 2017 it was the administrative centre of Tamsalu Parish.

Notable native
Marko Pomerants, former Estonian Minister of Social Affairs (April 10, 2003 – April 13, 2005), former Estonian Minister of the Interior (July 3, 2009 – April 5, 2011), former Estonian Minister of the Environment (April 9, 2015 – June 12, 2017), Member of the Estonian Parliament.

Gallery

References

External links

Cities and towns in Estonia
Former municipalities of Estonia